Ga'aguim (Longings) is the fifteenth album released by Israeli pop-rock band Ethnix. Released on May 29, 2011 by Helicon Records, it is their first album since 2005.

Track listing

Personnel

References

External links
 "חריף - אתניקס חוגגים אלבום חדש – "געגועים

2011 albums